The 1992 Nigerian Senate election in Ondo State was held on July 4, 1992, to elect members of the Nigerian Senate to represent Ondo State. Remi Okunrinboye representing Ondo East, Adebiyi Adekeye representing Ondo South and Olawale Adewunmi representing Ondo North all won on the platform of the Social Democratic Party.

Overview

Summary

Results

Ondo East 
The election was won by Remi Okunrinboye of the Social Democratic Party.

Ondo South 
The election was won by Adebiyi Adekeye of the Social Democratic Party.

Ondo North 
The election was won by Olawale Adewunmi of the Social Democratic Party.

References 

Ond
Ondo State Senate elections
July 1992 events in Nigeria